Durisan (also Romanized as Dūrīsān; also known as Dorīzān) is a village in Shamshir Rural District, in the Central District of Paveh County, Kermanshah Province, Iran. At the 2006 census, its population was 3,002, in 766 families.

References 

Populated places in Paveh County